The 2nd Grande Prêmio Cinema Brasil ceremony, presented by the Ministry of Culture of Brazil, honored the best audiovisual productions of 2000 and took place on February 10, 2001, at the Palácio Quitandinha in the city of Petrópolis, Rio de Janeiro beginning at 8:30 p.m. BRT. During the ceremony, the Ministry of Culture presented  the Grande Prêmio Cinema Brasil in 18 categories. The ceremony, televised by TV Cultura and Televisão Educativa, was directed by Bia Lessa and hosted by stylist Felipe Veloso.

Eu, Tu, Eles and O Auto da Compadecida, each receiving four awards, becoming the most award winners of the ceremony. Other feature film winners included Villa-Lobos – Uma Vida de Paixão and Castelo Rá-Tim-Bum with one award each. Hans Staden was the second film which most received nominations but did not won any award.

Ceremony
The ceremony was held on February 10, 2001, at the Palácio Quitandinha, a former luxury resort hotel in Petrópolis, State of Rio de Janeiro, Brazil, beginning at 8:30 p.m. BRT. Televised by TV Cultura and Televisão Educativa, the ceremony was directed by Bia Lessa and hosted by stylist Felipe Veloso. The ceremony started by honoring Sônia Braga, Renato Aragão and Nelson Pereira dos Santos who were hailed by Caetano Veloso, Mangueira members and by former collaborators respectively. It was followed by the awards which were handed by personalities—including singers Marina Lima and MV Bill, philosopher Gerd Bornheim, sprinter Robson Caetano, and journalist Pedro Bial—called onstage by Veloso to make a statement about cinema while the winner was announced on the screen.

Winners and nominees

Awards
Winners are listed first and highlighted in boldface.

Multiple nominations and awards

The following eleven films received multiple nominations.
 Ten: Eu, Tu, Eles
 Six: Hans Staden
 Five: O Auto da Compadecida
 Four: Castelo Rá-Tim-Bum, Estorvo
 Three: Amélia, Bossa Nova, O Dia da Caça, Villa-Lobos – Uma Vida de Paixão
 Two: Quase Nada, O Trapalhão e a Luz Azul

The following two films received multiple awards.
 Four: Eu, Tu, Eles and O Auto da Compadecida

See also

 List of Brazilian films of 2000
 2001 in film

Notes

References

2001 film awards
2001 in Brazil